Nicolae Corneanu (21 November 1923 – 28 September 2014) was a Romanian metropolitan bishop of the Romanian Orthodox Church who led the Metropolis of Banat from 1962 until his death in 2014.

Corneanu was born in Caransebeș. In 1992, he was elected an honorary member of the Romanian Academy.  He died in Timișoara, aged 90.

Honours

National honours
  Romanian Royal Family: 34th Knight of the Royal Decoration of the Cross of the Romanian Royal House
  Romanian Republic: Grand Cross of the Order of the Star of Romania
  Romanian Republic: Grand Cross of the Order of Merit
 : Order of the Star of the Romanian People's Republic, 2nd class

References

1923 births
2014 deaths
People from Caransebeș
Romanian Orthodox metropolitan bishops
Honorary members of the Romanian Academy
Recipients of the Order of the Star of the Romanian Socialist Republic
Recipients of the National Order of Merit (Romania)
Grand Crosses of the Order of the Star of Romania